You Should Be So Lucky was a BBC children's television programme broadcast in 1986–87. It was hosted by Colin Bennett in the character of Vince Purity.

It was a game show, during which contestants played on a giant snakes and ladders board.  Points were earned by their team partners through talent tasks (such as singing, or physical games).

Bennett had four assistants, three young girls and a boy, called the "Purettes". The girls would introduce themselves as 'April', 'May', and 'June' at the start of the show. The boy's name was Alex, but Bennett occasionally jokingly referred to him as 'July' in the show.

External links

UKGameshows: You Should Be So Lucky!

1986 British television series debuts
1987 British television series endings
BBC children's television shows
1980s British game shows
English-language television shows